The Collection is a two-disc compilation album by the synthpop duo Yazoo, released under licence from Mute Records by Music Club Deluxe, a division of Demon Music Group, in September 2012. It features all of the band's singles, along with various album tracks and remixes.

Track listing

Disc one

Disc two

References

2012 compilation albums
Yazoo (band) albums
Albums produced by Eric Radcliffe
Albums produced by Vince Clarke